Tightrope is a 1984 American neo-noir psychological mystery slasher crime thriller film directed and written by Richard Tuggle and produced by and starring Clint Eastwood.

Plot
A young woman (Jamie Rose) walking home from her birthday party is stalked by a man in distinctive sneakers. After she drops one of her presents, a police officer offers to escort her to her front door. The camera reveals that the policeman is wearing the same sneakers as the stalker.

The next day, divorced New Orleans police detective Wes Block (Eastwood) is playing football with his daughters Penny and Amanda. They take in a stray dog, adding to the several strays they have already taken in. As the family gets ready to go to a Saints game, Block is summoned to a crime scene, forcing him to break his plans with his daughters.

The young woman has been strangled in her bed. Her killer left no fingerprints, but he waited in her apartment until midnight to kill her, even pausing to make himself coffee. Block visits a brothel where the woman worked, and interviews a prostitute with whom she would perform group sex. The prostitute seduces Block, loosening his necktie, which he accidentally leaves behind.

The murderer rapes his victims, and he has been leaving behind a great deal of forensic evidence, including a residue of glass fragments and barley. Beryl Thibodeaux (Geneviève Bujold) runs a rape prevention program, and she advises Block on the case. The second victim is also a sex worker, and she is strangled in a jacuzzi. Block tracks down one of her co-workers and interviews her while the two prepare to have sex. He handcuffs the woman to the bed.

While Block inquires about the victims at another brothel, he has sex with a prostitute. The hidden killer watches Block and the prostitute. The next morning, Block is called to the scene of a third victim. He is shocked to realize that it is the prostitute he had been with the night before. Under the guise of working on the case, Block flirts with Thibodeaux, and the two spend the rest of the day together.

The killer taunts Block by sending a doll with a note, which directs him to another brothel. Once there, a dominatrix informs Block that an unknown man has hired her to be whipped by Block. She is then supposed to send Block to a gay bar. At the bar, Block meets up with a man who has been hired by the killer to have sex with Block. Block instructs the man to pick up his pay as scheduled and follows him, hoping to catch the killer. However, Block is too late, and the man is killed.

The killer kidnaps the second victim's co-worker, and he dumps her body in a public fountain. He drapes Block's abandoned necktie on a nearby statue. Block and Thibodeaux go out on a second date, escorting his children, while secretly observed by the killer disguised as a Mardi Gras participant. When they are in bed later, Block shies away from intimacy with Thibodeaux, and then has a nightmare that he attacks her in the guise of the killer.

One of the victim's clothes has some cash in it, which the police trace to the payroll of a brewery. The money has the same glass and barley residue on it that has been cropping up at all the crime scenes. When Block goes to the brewery to investigate, the killer watches him during his visit. That night, the killer breaks into Block's home, killing the nanny and some of Block's pets, and handcuffing and gagging Amanda. Block is nearly strangled in a struggle after he arrives and is only saved when one of his surviving dogs repeatedly bites the killer. Block fires two shots at the killer as he escapes. The killer is later seen watching from concealment as the police investigate the scene.

While going through news clippings, Block comes across the name of a cop, Leander Rolfe (Marco St. John), whom he arrested for raping two girls. Further investigation reveals that Rolfe had been paroled and was working at the brewery. Block and his team stake out Rolfe's apartment, but Rolfe has gone to attack Thibodeaux at her home (successfully slaying the cops guarding her). Realizing that she is in danger, Block races to her home, where he disturbs Rolfe's attempt to strangle her (despite being stabbed twice with scissors). Block chases Rolfe through a cemetery and into a rail yard. During their final battle, they end up in the path of an oncoming train;  Block manages to roll out of the way in time, but Rolfe is run over and killed. Block accepts Beryl's touch after he tells her everything will be okay.

Cast
 Clint Eastwood as Det. Wes Block
 Geneviève Bujold as Beryl Thibodeaux
 Dan Hedaya as Det. Joe Molinari
 Alison Eastwood as Amanda Block
 Jenny Beck as Penny Block
 Marco St. John as Leander Rolfe
 Rod Masterson as Patrolman Gallo
 Jamie Rose as Melanie Silber
 Janet MacLachlan as Dr. Yarlofsky

Production
Tightrope was filmed in New Orleans in the fall of 1983. While Tuggle retained the director's credit, Eastwood allegedly directed much of the movie after finding Tuggle worked too slowly.

Reception
The film was released in United States theaters in August 1984. It eventually grossed $48 million at the United States box office. In its opening weekend Tightrope was number 1, taking in $9,156,545, an average $5,965 per theater.

Critical response
Tightrope received mostly positive reviews from critics. The film has an 85% freshness rating on Rotten Tomatoes, out of 13 reviews. Roger Ebert praised the film for taking chances by exploring the idea of a hard-nosed cop learning to respect a woman. He cites the film as "a lot more ambitious" than the Dirty Harry movies. Ebert's colleague Gene Siskel also praised the film during their on-air review of the film on At the Movies, crediting the performance of the villain, the relationship between Eastwood and Geneviève Bujold, and Eastwood doing "a terrific job risking his star charisma playing a louse" and also "taking us inside to see what it's really like to abuse women". Janet Maslin concluded that the film "isn't quite top-level Eastwood, but it's close." David Denby stated that as an actor he (Eastwood) "gave his most complex and forceful performance to date."

References

Bibliography

External links
 
 
 

1984 directorial debut films
1984 films
1980s psychological thriller films
1980s slasher films
1980s serial killer films
1980s mystery thriller films
1980s crime thriller films
American crime thriller films
American mystery thriller films
American psychological thriller films
American erotic thriller films
American serial killer films
BDSM in films
Films produced by Clint Eastwood
Films set in New Orleans
Films shot in New Orleans
Films scored by Lennie Niehaus
Malpaso Productions films
American police detective films
1980s English-language films
1980s American films